Pachyballus transversus is a species of jumping spider in the genus Pachyballus found in Africa. It is the type species for the gnus. Its distribution includes Cameroon, Congo, Democratic Republic of the Congo, Ethiopia, Guinea-Bissau, Mozambique, Somalia, South Africa and Tanzania. The male was first described in 1900 and the female in 2020.

References

Salticidae
Spiders described in 1900
Spiders of Africa
Taxa named by Eugène Simon